The Museum of Arts and Sciences, often referred to as MOAS, is a museum in Daytona Beach, Florida, United States. The museum is a member of the American Alliance of Museums and an affiliate of the Smithsonian Institution. It is home to over 30,000 objects, making it one of the largest museums in central Florida.

History
The Museum of Arts & Sciences (MOAS) is the primary art, science and history museum in Central Florida. MOAS is a not-for-profit educational institution founded in 1955 and chartered by the State of Florida in 1962. The Museum is accredited by the American Association of Museums and is an affiliate of the Smithsonian Institution. Programs are sponsored in part by the State of Florida, Department of State, Division of Arts & Culture, the Florida Arts Council, the National Endowment for the Arts and the County of Volusia.

In 1977, art historian Gary Russell Libby was hired as the Executive Director of the Museum of Arts and Sciences which became accredited by the American Alliance of Museums and a Smithsonian Affiliate under Libby's leadership. The Museum grew from one location of 7,000 sq. ft. to 120,000 sq. ft. with three different locations. During his time as director, Libby organized and led the first international museum travel program in Florida. This annual program introduced cultural treasures in Mexico, Central America, South America, Europe, Scandinavia, North and Equatorial Africa, the Middle East, Asia and Australia to thousands of central Floridians who attended these interpreted educational and cultural expeditions. At his 2002 retirement, The Trustees of the Museum of Arts and Sciences named Libby as the first Director Emeritus and named the Lobby of the Museum as the "Gary R. Libby Entry Court."

The West Wing, renamed the L. Gale Lemerand Wing, was rebuilt and opened on October 30, 2015. This expansive wing of MOAS is home to the Cuban Foundation Museum, the Karshan Center of Graphic Art, the Elaine and Thurman Gillespy Jr. Gallery featuring African artifacts, the Marzullo Gallery featuring weaponry from around the world, and the Prehistory of Florida Gallery and the Charles and Linda William's Children's Museum. The L. Gale Lemerand Wing was originally built on a dip in the property and flooded in May 2009 due to heavy rains. The Museum was able to obtain FEMA funding that was matched in part by a Volusia County ECHO Grant and funding from the Museum to make reconstruction possible.

Exhibits
Some notable exhibits include:
 The most complete giant ground sloth skeleton in North America housed in a Florida fossil gallery
 The largest permanent exhibition of Cuban art outside of Cuba
 Coca-Cola entrepreneur Chapman Root's (The Root Glass Company) lifetime collection of Americana, including two private rail cars (The two being the Skytop Lounge, 'Dell Rapids', and an Observation Dome, 'Silver Holly'.), the second largest collection of Coca-Cola memorabilia in the world (featuring original molds and the original patents for the bottle), Indy race cars, teddy bears, and quilts.
 While about half of the exhibits are permanent, there are many exhibits which change every few months.
 A  collection of international decorative arts and Early American furniture and art
 A gallery of Chinese art
 Visible storage
 The Cici and Hyatt Brown Museum of Art which contains the largest collection of Florida art in the world.

The museum also has its own auditorium and planetarium.

Charles and Linda William's Children's Museum
MOAS opened the first science center in the area on November 21, 2008. The Charles and Linda William's Children's Museum features hands-on science exhibits in a  state-of-the-art facility. The Children's Museum is home to interactive exhibits that demonstrate various principles of science, including a raceway where kids can build their own vehicles, doctor and radiologist exhibits, tennis ball launcher, video light microscope, a make-believe pizza parlor, and more.

Gamble Place
Another off-site exhibit MOAS has to offer is Gamble Place. Nestled among the Spruce Creek Preserve, this property features Florida's rich natural environment and a unique historic past told by the property's three historic house museums. Gamble Place has been developed and restored by the Museum of Arts & Sciences in cooperation with the Nature Conservancy and the City of Port Orange. It is now a  park with trails that cover five different ecosystems and is home to many endangered and threatened species.

Klancke Environmental Education Complex
In 2005 MOAS opened the Kim A. Klancke, M.D. & Marsha L. Klancke Environmental Education Complex in Tuscawilla Preserve, a  nature preserve in the middle of Daytona Beach that includes over 1/2 mile of boardwalks and nature trails.  The preserve protects virgin Florida coastal hydric hammock, and is a habitat for endangered species of flora and fauna.

References

External links
 Museum of Arts and Sciences - official website
 Gamble Place
Museum of Arts and Sciences within Google Arts & Culture

Museums in Daytona Beach, Florida
Art museums and galleries in Florida
Institutions accredited by the American Alliance of Museums
Children's museums in Florida
Historic house museums in Florida
Planetaria in the United States
Science museums in Florida
Smithsonian Institution affiliates
Museums established in 1955
1955 establishments in Florida